A hyper-casual game is a mobile video game which is easy-to-play, and usually free-to-play; they also feature very minimalistic user interfaces. Popularized in 2017 by game makers such as Kwalee, Ketchapp and Voodoo, these games can be quickly played after downloading, usually without any tutorial or instructions. They also often use a 2D design with a simple color scheme, easy mechanics  adding to their simplicity. Usually featuring infinite looped mechanics, hyper-casual games are playable for an infinite amount of time, leading to their addictive nature. Some argue hyper-casuals are a business model, rather than a genre. These games are often played while multitasking, which is why their simple user interface is essential. Because of the lack of a robust in-game economy and free download cost of most hyper-causal games, revenue is mostly generated from ads.

Most of these ads come in the form of:

 Rewarded videos (when these ad videos are watched, the player is rewarded with extra time, extra lives, or other in-game rewards)
Banner ads (ads that appear at the bottom of the user's screen)
 Interstitial ads (advertisements that show between sessions)

History 
Hyper-casual games gained traction in 2017 in mobile gaming, but are often seen as a genre similar to the 1970s video games that lacked detailed design and gameplay. The first hyper-casual game that gained wide popularity was Flappy Bird, which saw over 50 million downloads and generated around $50,000 a day in its prime. Since then, hyper-casual games have dominated top-charts in multiple mobile game stores such as the Google Play Store and the App Store (iOS). According to the EEDAR, the majority of mobile video-game users play while multitasking, and because of their simplicity, hyper-casual games have become increasingly popular among these users.  In 2016, popular gaming company, Ubisoft, bought Ketchapp (one of the hyper-casual gaming company pioneers). In 2017, Goldman Sachs invested $200 million in hyper-casual gaming company Voodoo.

According to ironSource, hyper-casual games occupy 10 of the 15 top most downloaded games. Compare this to a year ago, when there were only 3 hyper-casual games in the top 15. In an interview with ironSource, founder of Destruction of Fun Mishka Katkoff explains their appeal:

“As casual games implement deeper, mid-core features they become more engaging, but also more complicated. This, in turn, opens up a segment for hyper-casual games to dominate – games that are easy to start and fun to play.”

References 

Gaming
 
Video game genres